Cedarville Township may refer to the following places in the United States:

 Cedarville Township, Michigan
 Cedarville Township, Greene County, Ohio

Township name disambiguation pages